is a former Japanese football player.

Playing career
Yoshida was born in Hofu on April 6, 1980. He joined J1 League club Sanfrecce Hiroshima from youth team in 1999. On June 23, 2001, he debuted as substitute forward against Gamba Osaka. However he could only play this match at the club. In 2002, he moved to Japan Football League club Ehime FC. He played many matches in 3 seasons and retired end of 2004 season.

Club statistics

References

External links

biglobe.ne.jp

1980 births
Living people
Association football people from Yamaguchi Prefecture
Japanese footballers
J1 League players
Japan Football League players
Sanfrecce Hiroshima players
Ehime FC players
Association football forwards